The name Karina has been used for three tropical cyclones in the Eastern Pacific Ocean. The name replaced Kenna, which was retired after the 2002 Pacific hurricane season.
 Tropical Storm Karina (2008)
 Hurricane Karina (2014)
 Tropical Storm Karina (2020)

See also
Tropical Storm Katrina
Tropical Storm Carina

Pacific hurricane set index articles